Aghajari Gas Injection Project is the world’s biggest enhanced oil recovery) project to be inaugurated in Iran in late 2008.

The total quantities extracted since the start of operations at Aghajari till this date have been 8.8 bn barrels.

However, production has been on the decline because of loss of pressure and oil extraction, so that current output is  a day.

Project consists of three main parts;

Upstream:

Development of South Pars phases 6, 7 and 8.

Midstream:

The 504-km long, 56-inch pipeline for transfer of sour gas from the South Pars gas field phases 6,7 and 8 to be injected to Aghajari oilfield.

Downstream:

Installation of a gas-compression station, drilling of 19 new wells, work over of 3 existing wells for gas injection, installing pipelines on 2 existing gas injecting wells.

See also
World Largest Gas Fields
National Iranian Gas Company
NIOC Recent Discoveries
Iran Natural Gas Reserves
South Pars
North Pars
Kish Gas Field
Golshan Gas Field
Ferdowsi Gas Field
Persian LNG
Iran Gas Trunkline (IGAT)

References and footnotes

Petroleum industry in Iran